Caesar and Cleopatra is a play written in 1898 by George Bernard Shaw that depicts a fictionalized account of the relationship between Julius Caesar and Cleopatra. It was first published with Captain Brassbound's Conversion and The Devil's Disciple in Shaw's 1901 collection Three Plays for Puritans. It was first performed in a single staged reading at Newcastle upon Tyne on 15 March 1899, to secure the copyright. The play was produced in New York in 1906 and in London at the Savoy Theatre in 1907.

Plot 
The play has a prologue and an "Alternative to the Prologue". The prologue consists of the Egyptian god Ra addressing the audience directly, as if he could see them in the theater (i.e., breaking the fourth wall). He says that Pompey represents the old Rome and Caesar represents the new Rome. The gods favored Caesar, according to Ra, because he "lived the life they had given him boldly". Ra recounts the conflict between Caesar and Pompey, their battle at Pharsalus, and Pompey's eventual assassination in Egypt at the hands of Lucius Septimius.

In "An Alternative to the Prologue", we find Cleopatra has been driven into Syria by her brother, Ptolemy, with whom she is vying for the Egyptian throne. A messenger appears to warn the captain of Cleopatra's guard that Caesar has landed and is invading Egypt.  The messenger warns that Caesar's conquest is inevitable and irresistible. A Nubian watchman flees to Cleopatra's palace and warns those inside that Caesar and his armies are less than an hour away. The guards, knowing of Caesar's weakness for women, plan to persuade him to proclaim Cleopatra—who may be controllable—Egypt's ruler instead of Ptolemy. They try to locate her, but are told by Cleopatra's nurse, Ftatateeta, that she has run away.

(The film version of the play, made in 1945, used the Alternative Prologue rather than the original one.)

Act I opens with Cleopatra sleeping between the paws of a Sphinx. Caesar, wandering lonely in the desert night, comes upon the sphinx and speaks to it profoundly. Cleopatra wakes and, still unseen, replies. At first Caesar imagines the sphinx is speaking in a girlish voice, then, when Cleopatra appears, that he is experiencing a dream or, if he is awake, a touch of madness. She, not recognizing Caesar, thinks him a nice old man and tells him of her childish fear of Caesar and the Romans. Caesar urges bravery when she must face the conquerors, then escorts her to her palace. Cleopatra reluctantly agrees to maintain a queenly presence, but greatly fears that Caesar will eat her anyway. When the Roman guards arrive and hail Caesar, Cleopatra suddenly realizes he has been with her all along. She sobs in relief, and falls into his arms.

Act II. In a hall on the first floor of the royal palace in Alexandria, Caesar meets King Ptolemy (aged ten), his tutor Theodotus (very aged), Achillas (general of Ptolemy's troops), and Pothinus (his guardian). Caesar greets all with courtesy and kindness, but inflexibly demands a tribute whose amount disconcerts the Egyptians. As an inducement, Caesar says he will settle the dispute between the claimants for the Egyptian throne by letting Cleopatra and Ptolemy reign jointly. However, the rivalry exists because, even though the two are siblings and already married in accordance with the royal law, they detest each other with a mutual antipathy no less murderous for being childish. Each claims sole rulership. Caesar's solution is acceptable to none and his concern for Ptolemy makes Cleopatra fiercely jealous.

The conference deteriorates into a dispute, with the Egyptians threatening military action. Caesar, with two legions (three thousand soldiers and a thousand horsemen), has no fear of the Egyptian army but learns Achillas also commands a Roman army of occupation, left after a previous Roman incursion, which could overwhelm his relatively small contingent.

As a defensive measure, Caesar orders Rufio, his military aide, to take over the palace, a theatre adjacent to it, and Pharos, an island in the harbour accessible from the palace via a causeway that divides the harbour into eastern and western sections. From Pharos, which has a defensible lighthouse at its eastmost tip, those of Caesar's ships anchored on the east side of the harbour can return to Rome. His ships on the west side are to be burnt at once. Britannus, Caesar's secretary, proclaims the king and courtiers prisoners of war, but Caesar, to the dismay of Rufio, allows the captives to depart. Only Cleopatra (with her retinue), fearing Ptolemy's associates, and Pothinus (for reasons of his own), choose to remain with Caesar. The others all depart.

Caesar, intent on developing his strategy, tries to dismiss all other matters but is interrupted by Cleopatra's nagging for attention. He indulges her briefly while she speaks amorously of Mark Antony, who restored her father to his throne when she was twelve years old. Her gushing about the youth and beauty of Mark Antony are unflattering to Caesar, who is middle-aged and balding. Caesar nevertheless, impervious to jealousy, makes Cleopatra happy by promising to send Mark Antony back to Egypt. As she leaves, a wounded soldier comes to report that Achillas, with his Roman army, is at hand and that the citizenry is attacking Caesar's soldiers. A siege is imminent.

Watching from a balcony, Rufio discovers the ships he was ordered to destroy have been torched by Achillas' forces and are already burning. Meanwhile, Theodotus, the savant, arrives distraught, anguished because fire from the blazing ships has spread to the Alexandrian library. Caesar does not sympathize, saying it is better that the Egyptians should live their lives than dream them away with the help of books. As a practicality, he notes the Egyptian firefighters will be diverted from attacking Caesar's soldiers. At scene's end, Cleopatra and Britannus help Caesar don his armor and he goes forth to battle.

Act III.  A Roman sentinel stationed on the quay in front of the palace looks intently, across the eastern harbour, to the west, for activity at the Pharos lighthouse, now captured and occupied by Caesar. He is watching for signs of an impending counter-attack by Egyptian forces arriving via ship and by way of the Heptastadion (a stone causeway spanning the five miles of open water between the mainland and Pharos Island). The sentinel's vigil is interrupted by Ftatateeta (Cleopatra's nurse) and Apollodorus the Sicilian (a patrician amateur of the arts), accompanied by a retinue of porters carrying a bale of carpets, from which Cleopatra is to select a gift appropriate for Caesar.

Cleopatra emerges from the palace, shows little interest in the carpets, and expresses a desire to visit Caesar at the lighthouse. The sentinel tells her she is a prisoner and orders her back inside the palace. Cleopatra is enraged, and Apollodorus, as her champion, engages in swordplay with the sentinel. A centurion intervenes and avers Cleopatra will not be allowed outside the palace until Caesar gives the order. She is sent back to the palace, where she may select a carpet for delivery to Caesar. Apollodorus, who is not a prisoner, will deliver it since he is free to travel in areas behind the Roman lines. He hires a small boat, with a single boatmen, for the purpose.

The porters leave the palace bearing a rolled carpet. They complain about its weight, but only Ftatateeta, suffering paroxysms of anxiety, knows that Cleopatra is hidden in the bundle. The sentinel, however, alerted by Ftatateeta's distress, becomes suspicious and attempts, unsuccessfully, to recall the boat after it departs.

Meanwhile, Rufio, eating dates and resting after the day's battle, hears Caesar speaking somberly of his personal misgivings and predicting they will lose the battle because age has rendered him inept. Rufio diagnoses Caesar's woes as signs of hunger and gives him dates to eat. Caesar's outlook brightens as he eats them. He is himself again when Britannus exultantly approaches bearing a heavy bag containing incriminating letters that have passed between Pompey's associates and their army, now occupying Egypt. Caesar scorns to read them, deeming it better to convert his enemies to friends than to waste his time with prosecutions; he casts the bag into the sea.

As Cleopatra's boat arrives, the falling bag breaks its prow and it quickly sinks, barely allowing time for Apollodorus to drag the carpet and its queenly contents safe ashore. Caesar unrolls the carpet and discovers Cleopatra, who is distressed because of the rigors of her journey and even more so when she finds Caesar too preoccupied with military matters to accord her much attention. Matters worsen when Britannus, who has been observing the movements of the Egyptian army, reports that the enemy now controls the causeway and is also approaching rapidly across the island. Swimming to a Roman ship in the eastern harbour becomes the sole possibility for escape. Apollodorus dives in readily and Caesar follows, after privately instructing Rufio and Britannus to toss Cleopatra into the water so she can hang on while he swims to safety. They do so with great relish, she screaming mightily, then Rufio takes the plunge. Britannus cannot swim, so he is instructed to defend himself as well as possible until a rescue can be arranged. A friendly craft soon rescues all the swimmers.

Act IV. Six months elapse with Romans and Cleopatra besieged in the palace in Alexandria.
Cleopatra and Pothinus, who is a prisoner of war, discuss what will happen when Caesar eventually leaves and disagree over whether Cleopatra or Ptolemy should rule. They part; Cleopatra to be hostess at a feast prepared for Caesar and his lieutenants, and Pothinus to tell Caesar that Cleopatra is a traitress who is only using Caesar to help her gain the Egyptian throne. Caesar considers that a natural motive and is not offended. But Cleopatra is enraged at Pothinus' allegation and secretly orders her nurse, Ftatateeta, to kill him.

At the feast the mood is considerably restrained by Caesar's ascetic preference for simple fare and barley water versus exotic foods and wines. However, conversation grows lively when world-weary Caesar suggests to Cleopatra they both leave political life, search out the Nile's source and a city there. Cleopatra enthusiastically agrees and, to name the city, seeks help from the God of the Nile, who is her favorite god.

The festivities are interrupted by a scream, followed by a thud: Pothinus has been murdered and his body thrown from the roof down to the beach. The besieging Egyptians, both army and civilian, are enraged by the killing of Pothinus, who was a popular hero, and they begin to storm the palace. Cleopatra claims responsibility for the slaying and Caesar reproaches her for taking shortsighted vengeance, pointing out that his clemency towards Pothinus and the other prisoners has kept the enemy at bay. Doom seems inevitable, but then they learn that reinforcements, commanded by Mithridates of Pergamos have engaged the Egyptian army. With the threat diminished, Caesar draws up a battle plan and leaves to speak to the troops. Meanwhile, Rufio realizes Ftatateeta was Pothinus' killer, so he kills her in turn. Cleopatra, left alone and utterly forlorn discovers the bloodied body concealed behind a curtain.

Act V is an epilogue. Amidst great pomp and ceremony, Caesar prepares to leave for Rome. His forces have swept Ptolemy's armies into the Nile, and Ptolemy himself was drowned when his barge sank. Caesar appoints Rufio governor of the province and considers freedom for Britannus, who declines the offer in favor of remaining Caesar's servant. A conversation ensues that foreshadows Caesar's eventual assassination. As the gangplank is being extended from the quay to Caesar's ship, Cleopatra, dressed in mourning for her nurse, arrives. She accuses Rufio of murdering Ftatateeta. Rufio admits the slaying, but says it was not for the sake of punishment, revenge or justice: he killed her without malice because she was a potential menace. Caesar approves the execution because it was not influenced by spurious moralism. Cleopatra remains unforgiving until Caesar renews his promise to send Mark Antony to Egypt. That renders her ecstatic as the ship starts moving out to sea.

Themes 

Shaw wanted to prove that it was not love but politics that drew Cleopatra to Julius Caesar. He sees the Roman occupation of ancient Egypt as similar to the British occupation that was occurring during his time.  Caesar understands the importance of good government, and values these things above art and love.

Shaw's philosophy has often been compared to that of Nietzsche. Their shared admiration for men of action shows itself in Shaw's description of Caesar's struggle with Pompey. In the prologue, the god Ra says, "the blood and iron ye pin your faith on fell before the spirit of man; for the spirit of man is the will of the gods."

A second theme, apparent both from the text of the play itself and from Shaw's lengthy notes after the play, is Shaw's belief that people have not been morally improved by civilization and technology. A line from the prologue clearly illustrates this point. The god Ra addresses the audience and says, "ye shall marvel, after your ignorant manner, that men twenty centuries ago were already just such as you, and spoke and lived as ye speak and live, no worse and no better, no wiser and no sillier."

Another theme is the value of clemency. Caesar remarks that he will not stoop to vengeance when confronted with Septimius, the murderer of Pompey. Caesar throws away letters that would have identified his enemies in Rome, instead choosing to try to win them to his side. Pothinus remarks that Caesar doesn't torture his captives. At several points in the play, Caesar lets his enemies go instead of killing them. The wisdom of this approach is revealed when Cleopatra orders her nurse to kill Pothinus because of his "treachery and disloyalty" (but really because of his insults to her). This probably contrasts with historical fact.  The murder enrages the Egyptian crowd, and but for Mithridates' reinforcements would have meant the death of all the protagonists.  Caesar only endorses the retaliatory murder of Cleopatra's nurse because it was necessary and humane.

Stage productions 

 The play was first performed in March 1899 by Mrs Patrick Campbell's company at the Theatre Royal, Newcastle
 Shaw wrote the part of Caesar for Shakespearean actor Johnston Forbes-Robertson, who played it opposite his wife Gertrude Elliott.
A 1925 Broadway production starring Lionel Atwill and Helen Hayes was a major hit that opened the Guild Theatre.
Cedric Hardwicke, Lilli Palmer, and Bertha Belmore starred in a production of the play performed in 1949–50 at the National Theatre on Broadway.
Laurence Olivier and Vivien Leigh played the title roles in repertory with Shakespeare's Antony and Cleopatra in 1951 at London's St James's Theatre and later on Broadway.
John Gielgud played Caesar at the Chichester Festival in 1971. He was Shaw's first choice for the role in the 1945 film but declined the offer after meeting with the director Gabriel Pascal and taking an instant dislike towards him.
Rex Harrison played Caesar on Broadway in 1977, recreating his Academy Award-nominated role from the film Cleopatra (1963). Elizabeth Ashley portrayed Cleopatra.
Between 1962 and 1963 a Greek stage production of the play was shown in Greece and Cyprus with actress Aliki Vougiouklaki in the role of Cleopatra.
A 2008 Stratford Shakespeare Festival production, directed by Des McAnuff, starred Christopher Plummer as Caesar and Nikki M. James as Cleopatra. It has also been released as a film.
A 2019 production by The Gingold Theatrical Group ran off-Broadway in the Theatre Row Building, starring Robert Cuccioli and Brenda Braxton, directed by David Staller.

Film, television and audio versions of the play 

Caesar and Cleopatra was the basis for the lavish 1945 motion picture Caesar and Cleopatra, starring Claude Rains as Caesar and Vivien Leigh as Cleopatra and produced by Gabriel Pascal. Shaw collaborated closely on this production. After seeing part of the filming of the movie at Denham Studios in London, Shaw remarked, "What scope!  What limitless possibilities!... Here you have the whole world to play with!"

There have also been two major television productions of the play. The first was in 1956, produced as part of the anthology series Producers' Showcase, on NBC. It starred Claire Bloom as Cleopatra, Cedric Hardwicke as Caesar, Farley Granger, Jack Hawkins and Judith Anderson. The second version, shown in 1976, was also telecast by NBC, and starred Geneviève Bujold as Cleopatra, Alec Guinness as Caesar, Clive Francis, Margaret Courtenay, and Iain Cuthbertson. It was telecast on the Hallmark Hall of Fame.

The 2008 Stratford Festival production starring Christopher Plummer in the role of Caesar, and Nikki M. James as Cleopatra was shown in very limited release in cinemas on January 31, 2009. It was subsequently shown on Bravo in Canada and released on a DVD, which is available from the Festival.

A 1965 audio adaptation of the play was produced by Caedmon Records (Caedmon TRS 304M) and directed by Anthony Quayle, starring Max Adrian as Caesar, Claire Bloom as Cleopatra, Judith Anderson as Ftatateeta, Corin Redgrave as Apollodorus, Laurence Hardy as Britannus and Jack Gwillim as Rufio. This version used the Alternate Prologue.

The BBC broadcast a radio production on 27 August 1980 starring the father-daughter acting team of Alan Badel (Caesar) and Sarah Badel (Cleopatra). Also in the cast were Beatrix Lehmann as Ftatateeta, Peter Woodthorpe as Pothinus and Alan Rowe as Lucius Septimius.

Musical adaptation 
Caesar and Cleopatra was adapted for the 1968 Broadway musical Her First Roman by Ervin Drake.

References

External links 

 Three Plays for Puritans: The Devil's Disciple, Cæsar and Cleopatra, & Captain Brassbound's Conversion, a digitized copy of the first edition from Internet Archive.
 Caesar and Cleopatra, including the alternative prologues.
 
 
 

Plays by George Bernard Shaw
1901 plays
Depictions of Julius Caesar in plays
Depictions of Cleopatra in plays
Plays based on real people
British plays adapted into films
Plays set in ancient Egypt